Mthetheleli Godfrey 'Tazz' Fuzani (born 18 January 1991) is a South African rugby union player for the  in the Currie Cup and in the Rugby Challenge. His regular position is lock, but he has also started as a prop.

Career

Youth and Varsity Rugby

Fuzani was part of the  squad at the 2008 Under-18 Academy Week. In 2011, he was included in the  squad for the 2011 Varsity Shield competition and played twice in the 2012 Varsity Shield competition, starting the match against  as a prop. In 2013, he firmly established himself in the team under former South Africa national rugby union team coach Peter de Villiers, starting all nine matches.

Western Province

Fuzani was included in 's squad for the 2013 Vodacom Cup and made his first class debut for them a mere five days after playing his final 2013 Varsity Shield match, starting their match against  in Paarl.

Stormers

Eastern Province Kings

In July 2014, Fuzani's agent confirmed that he would leave Cape Town at the end of the 2014 season and join Port Elizabeth-based side  on a two-year contract. He made his debut for the EP Kings by starting their first match of the 2015 Vodacom Cup season, a 19–27 defeat to defending champions .

References

South African rugby union players
Living people
1991 births
People from Uitenhage
Western Province (rugby union) players
Rugby union props
Rugby union players from the Eastern Cape